The Bookmaking Habits of Select Species is a short story by Ken Liu that compares and contrasts five fictional alien species' unique styles of reading and writing.

Species

Allatians
A species of music who believe their writing system is superior to all. An Allatian author speaks as he writes, causing his nose to vibrate and etch grooves into the surface of a metal tablet covered in wax or clay. To read, one uses their nose to follow through the grooves, while a hollow chamber in their skull turns the vibrations to sound, recreating the author's voice, tone, emotion, and rhythm.  However, every time a book is read it is damaged and some details are lost. In order to preserve the most precious works, they are locked away in forbidden libraries.

Quatzoli
Mechanical people but it is unknown if they were always that way or are creations of another organism. Their bodies are made of hourglass shaped copper.  A couple times a day, they take in water through their bottom chamber and then dip themselves into lava lakes.  This causes steam to pass through the narrow part of their body and into the upper chamber to power various gears that allow the being to function. This process creates a stone that contains several millions of channels that water can pass through. As time goes on, the channels alter, causing memories to be lost and formed.
A Quatzoli child is created in a forge and given a sliver of its parent's mind, which allows it to begin its life. As the child learns, its brain grows around the sliver until it is time to divide its mind for its own children. Because of this system, these beings are living books with accumulated knowledge passed down from their ancestors.

Hesperoe
Once a violent race which, although it once had its own form of writing, no longer uses it at all. They have always distrusted writing because books give facts and exciting stories but have no solid proof to justify their claims. The Hesperoes would write down their thoughts only when memories could not be trusted. Some of their favorite things are speech and debate, but they love the glories of war. Once mind storage and mapping was discovered they stopped writing altogether. Prior to death great minds are harvested from the bodies of leaders and other intellectual individuals of their species and each path is mapped in order to predict their next thought. They then expand upon those minds to see into the future. So the great minds of Hesperoe never die and their memories can be looked at through these maps for guidance.

Tull-Toks
Ghost-like organisms made of energy that do not have a form of writing but claim that everything can be read. They travel by grabbing on to star ships of other species without being noticed. Tull-Toks believe each star is living text where each aspect of it serves a different purpose and that each planet has a poem. It is said that the greatest books lie within black holes but none of their kind has ever returned from such a reading, so many pass it off as a myth. Many species consider this organism to be an illiterate fraud that rely on such tales to hide their own ignorance.

Curu'ee
Organisms about the size of a period at the end of a sentence, they travel to obtain books that have lost all meaning and can no longer be read by the authors' descendants. Because many other races don't view the Curu'ee as a threat due to their size, they are capable of obtaining what they want without any trouble.

 Earth — The people of Earth gave them tablets and vases incised with linear A, bundles of knotted strings called quipus, and ancient magnetic discs and cubes that they no longer knew how to decipher.
 Hesperoe — After the Hesperoe had ceased their wars of conquest, they gave the Caru'ee ancient stones that they believed to be books looted from the Quatzoli.
 Untou — A species that writes using fragrances and flavors, they allowed the Curu'ee to have some old bland books whose scents were too faint to be read.

The Curu'ee built their cities from the unused books: vases and tablets turned into thoroughfares, quipu fibers were rewoven and tied into marketplaces, magnetic discs became entertainment arenas, and Quatzoli stone brains turned into a research complex. The Curu'ee "read without knowing they are reading."

Background
Ken Liu drew his inspiration for The Bookmaking Habits of Select Species from his admiration of stories about whole groups of people or ideas, like Italo Calvino's Invisible Cities. This was his first serious attempt at writing in this style. Through this short story, Liu wanted to imagine forms of writing different from human's tangible form.

Critical reception
Most agreed that the story was descriptive, less sentimental than most of Liu's other works, and written in an unusual format, but critics disagreed as to whether the format and lack of sentiment were an improvement.

Awards and nominations
 Nominated for the 2012 Nebula Award for Best Short Story
 Finalist for the 2013 Theodore Sturgeon Memorial Award
 Finalist for the 2013 WSFA Small Press Award

Publication History
 Originally published on August 7, 2012 in Lightspeed magazine issue 7 with the audio version read by Stefan Rudnicki
 Reprinted by io9 and in Aliens: Recent Encounters
 Polish Translation published on ksiazki.polter.pl on March 27, 2013
 A Chinese translation was published in Science Fiction World, July 2013
 Another Chinese translation was published in Douban Read by Xia Jia also in 2013
 Reprinted in Nebula Awards Showcase 2014 and edited by Kij Johnson
 Russian translation published in Kosmoport, December 2014

References

External links
 The Bookmaking Habits of Select Species -The original publication on Lightspeed magazine's website
  Author's official website

Science fiction short stories
2012 short stories